The Périgny River is a tributary of the O'Sullivan River, flowing into the Canadian province of Quebec, Canada, or in the administrative regions of:
Abitibi-Témiscamingue: regional county municipality (MRC) of La Vallée-de-l'Or Regional County Municipality, in Senneterre, Quebec, in the township of Labrie;
Nord-du-Québec: regional county municipality (RCM) of Eeyou Istchee Baie-James (municipality), in the townships of Ralleau and Ruette.

The hydrographic slope of the Périgny River is accessible on the R1018 road (North-South direction) passing on the north-west side of the lake. This road is attached to the south at road 113 linking Lebel-sur-Quévillon to Chibougamau.

The surface of the Périgny River is usually frozen from early November to mid-May, however safe ice circulation is generally from mid-November to mid-April.

Geography 
The main hydrographic slopes near Périgny river are:
North Side: O'Sullivan River, Waswanipi River, Lake Waswanipi;
East side: Wetetnagami River, Panache River, Fortier River;
South side: O'Sullivan River, Wetetnagami River, Wetetnagami Lake;
West side: O'Sullivan River, Kiask River, Bell River.

The Périgny River rises from a forest stream near Highway 1018 (North-South direction) at the foot of the Waswanipi Hills, at:
 east of the "Lac de la Ligne";
 south of the mouth of the Périgny River (confluence with the O'Sullivan River;
 southeast of the mouth of the O'Sullivan River (confluence with Lake Waswanipi;
 southeast of the mouth of Lake Waswanipi (confluence with the Waswanipi River);
 southeast of the mouth of Goéland Lake (Waswanipi River);
 south-east of the mouth of Matagami Lake;
 south-east of the mouth of the Nottaway River;
 east of the village center of Lebel-sur-Quévillon.

From its source, the "Périgny River" flows on  according to the following segments:
 to the east (parallel to the boundary of the townships of Ralleau and Labrie) in the township of Labrie, to the southern limit of the township of Ralleau.
 northward in the canton of Ralleau, to the south shore of Lac Périgny;
 to the North, crossing Lake Périgny on its full length;
 to the north, crossing a lake at the end of the segment;
 northwesterly to the outlet (from the southwest) of three lakes, including Villejouin Lake;

The Périgny River flows into a river bend on the south shore of the [O'Sullivan River], which generally flows northward to the south shore of Lake Waswanipi. From this mouth, the current flows north on the Lake Waswanipi to its mouth. From there, the current flows first north through the Waswanipi River, then west to the east shore of Goéland Lake (Waswanipi River). The current of the latter flows towards the West, to the East shore of Goéland Lake. The latter is crossed to the northwest by the Waswanipi River which is a tributary of Matagami Lake.

The mouth of the Périgny River located at:
 southeast of the mouth of the O'Sullivan River;
 southeast of the mouth of Lake Waswanipi (confluence with the Waswanipi River);
 south-east of a bay south of Goéland Lake (Waswanipi River);
 south-east of the mouth of Gull Lake (Waswanipi River);
 southeast of the mouth of Olga Lake (Waswanipi River);
 south of the village center of Waswanipi;
 north-east of the village center of Lebel-sur-Quévillon.

Toponymy 
The term "Périgny" is a family name of French origin.

The toponym "Périgny River" was formalized on December 5, 1968, at the Commission de toponymie du Québec, i.e. at the creation of this commission

References

See also 

Rivers of Nord-du-Québec
Nottaway River drainage basin
Eeyou Istchee James Bay